Lygropia sumatralis is a moth in the family Crambidae. It was described by Charles Swinhoe in 1916. It is found on Sumatra in Indonesia.

References

Moths described in 1916
Lygropia